The Aspekte-Literaturpreis (Aspekte Literature Prize) is awarded annually for the best debut novel written in German, as judged by a panel of writers, critics, and scholars. The prize is sponsored by the ZDF television network through its arts program, . It is valued at 10,000 Euros. Past recipients include Georg Büchner Prize-winner Felicitas Hoppe and Nobel Prize-winner Herta Müller. The award was established in 1979.

Winners

1979 Hanns-Josef Ortheil for Fermer
1980 Michael Schneider for Das Spiegelkabinett
1981 Thomas Hürlimann for Die Tessinerin
1982 Inge Merkel for Das andere Gesicht
1983 Zsuzsanna Gahse for Zero
1983 Beat Sterchi for Blösch
1984 Herta Müller for Niederungen
1985 Jochen Beyse for Der Aufklärungsmacher
1986 Barbara Honigmann for Roman von einem Kinde
1987 Erich Hackl for Auroras Anlaß
1988 Christa Moog for Aus tausend grünen Spiegeln
1989 Irina Liebmann for Mitten im Krieg
1990 Ulrich Woelk for Freigang
1991 Burkhard Spinnen for Dicker Mann im Meer
1992 Dagmar Leupold for Edmond
1993 Manfred Rumpl for Koordinaten der Liebe
1994 Radek Knapp for Franio
1995 Ingo Schulze for 33 Augenblicke des Glücks
1996 Felicitas Hoppe for Picknick der Friseure
1997 Zoë Jenny for Das Blütenstaubzimmer
1998 John von Düffel for Vom Wasser
1999 Christoph Peters for Stadt Land Fluß
2000 Andreas Maier for Wäldchestag
2001 Sherko Fatah for Im Grenzland
2002 Zsuzsa Bánk for Der Schwimmer
2003 Roswitha Haring for Ein Bett aus Schnee
2004 Thomas Stangl for Der einzige Ort
2005 Jens Petersen for Die Haushälterin
2006 Paul Ingendaay for Warum Du mich verlassen hast
2007 Thomas von Steinaecker for Wallner beginnt zu fliegen
2008 María Cecilia Barbetta for Änderungsschneiderei Los Milagros
2009 Stephan Thome for Grenzgang
2010 Dorothee Elmiger for Einladung an die Waghalsigen
2011 Eugen Ruge for In Zeiten des abnehmenden Lichts
2012 Teresa Präauer for Für den Herrscher aus Übersee
2013 Eberhard Rathgeb for Kein Paar wie wir
2014 Katja Petrowskaja for Vielleicht Esther
2015 Kat Kaufmann for Superposition
2016 Philipp Winkler for Hool
2017 Juliana Kálnay for Eine kurze Chronik des allmählichen Verschwindens
2018 Bettina Wilpert for nichts, was uns passiert
2019  for Kintsugi
2020 Deniz Ohde for Streulicht
2021 Ariane Koch for Die Aufdrängung
2022 Sven Pfizenmaier for Draußen feiern die Leute

References

External links
Aspekte website (in German).

German literary awards
First book awards
1979 establishments in Germany
Awards established in 1979